Gaisford is a surname. Notable people with the surname include:

John Gaisford (born 1934), English Anglican bishop
Richard Gaisford, British newsreader
Steve Gaisford, British newsreader
Thomas Gaisford (1779–1855), English classical scholar and Anglican priest